Kill 'Em and Eat 'Em is a 1987 album by the UK underground group Pink Fairies.

This is a reformed Pink Fairies, prompted by an offer from Jake Riviera, head of Demon Records. Of the five original group members, Paul Rudolph wasn't involved. Wallis' preference for having a fellow guitarist led to the inclusion of the only non-former member Andy Colquhoun, but Colquhoun had worked extensively alongside Wallis during the late 1980s Mick Farren group. Farren himself contributes some lyrics, including those of a re-recording of his "Broken Statue" single.

Track listing
"Broken Statue" (Wallis, Farren)
"Fear of Love" (Wallis)
"Undercover of Confusion" (Colquhoun)
"Waiting for the Ice Cream to Melt" (Colquhoun, Farren)
"Taking LSD" (Wallis, Sanderson)
"White Girls on Amphetamine" (Colquhoun, Farren)
"Seeing Double" (Wallis)
"Fool About You" (Wallis)
"Bad Attitude" (Wallis, Norman Gordon-Pilkington)
"I Might Be Lying" (Colquhoun, Wallis)

Personnel
Pink Fairies
Andy Colquhoun – guitar, vocals
Larry Wallis – guitar, vocals
Duncan Sanderson – bass 
Russell Hunter – drums
Twink – drums, vocals
Technical
Recorded at Picnic Studios
Engineered and mixed by Mike Banks
Assistant Engineer - Spyda
Keith Morris - photography

References

1984 albums
Pink Fairies albums